Governor Foster may refer to:

Charles Foster (Ohio politician) (1828–1904), 35th Governor of Ohio
Mike Foster (American politician) (born 1930), 53rd Governor of Louisiana, grandson of Murphy J. Foster
Murphy J. Foster (1849–1921), 31st Governor of Louisiana
Robert Sidney Foster (1913–2005), Governor of Fiji from 1968 to 1973 and Governor of the Solomon Islands from 1964 to 1969